Goniothalamus calycinus is a species of plant in the Annonaceae family. It is a tree endemic to Peninsular Malaysia.

References

calycinus
Endemic flora of Peninsular Malaysia
Trees of Peninsular Malaysia
Vulnerable plants
Taxonomy articles created by Polbot
Taxa named by James Sinclair (botanist)